Christiana Rosenberg-Ahlhaus (born in Germany) is an individual rhythmic gymnast. She was the 1975 World all-around silver medalist.

Biography 
The absence of rhythmic gymnasts from the Soviet Union, Bulgaria and East Germany. Western German athletes at the time, the highest ranked athletes remaining in contention meant Rosenberg and teammate Carmen Rischer competing at the 1975 World Championships in Madrid, Spain. Rosenberg went on to win the All-around silver medal behind teammate Rischer, she also won the gold medal in Ball and Clubs and a silver medal for Ribbon.

After her competitive career, Rosenberg studied ‘Play-Music-Dance’ at the Deutsche Sporthochschule Köln; and upon completing her studies she worked there as a teacher in the field of rhythm and dance. Since 1984 she has been a scientific assistant at the University of Konstanz, where she holds a doctorate degree and is in charge of training in the field of dance and dance research, among others. Since 1986 she has been directing the dance group of the University of Konstanz and collaborating as a dancer in several contemporary productions.  She is also the author of various specialist books on the topic of dance and movement, and has been the chairwoman of the Gesellschaft für Tanzforschung since 2012.

References

External links
Dr.Rosenberg-University of Konstanz
 Rhythmic Gymnastics Results

German rhythmic gymnasts
1958 births
Living people
Medalists at the Rhythmic Gymnastics World Championships
20th-century German women
21st-century German women